Adrian Francis Utley (born 27 April 1957) is an English musician and producer, and a member of the band Portishead.

Career
Born in Northampton, Utley moved to Bristol in the mid 1980s, and heavily into jazz, played guitar with Big John Patton's touring band and Art Blakey's Jazz Messengers. He built up a collection of vintage instruments and studio equipment, and moved into production and film work.

Portishead formed in 1990 with the first album Dummy released in 1994 followed by Portishead in 1997. Third was released in April 2008. During Portishead's hiatus between the second and third albums, Utley's production work included Beth Gibbons and Rustin' Man's Out of Season and he worked with fellow Portishead member Geoff Barrow as the Jimi Entley Sound and Fuzzface.

During his career, Utley has recorded with artists as diverse as Marilyn Manson, Jeff Beck, Torres, Perfume Genius, Alain Bashung and Marianne Faithfull, and his film work includes Sound by Nic Roeg and Spiders from Mars with David Attenborough.

In 2009, he was part of the jazz collective Stonephace, releasing a self-titled album. In 2010, he composed a new soundtrack for silent film The Passion of Joan of Arc with Will Gregory (of Goldfrapp), performed by a 23 piece orchestra conducted by Charles Hazlewood. In 2012, he was commissioned by the National Trust to produce "Sonic Journey," a piece of music inspired by walking among the trees at Croft Castle. In 2013, he performed Terry Riley's "In C" with an ensemble including a bass clarinet, four organs (played by Hazlewood), and 19 guitars (including John Parish), the performance released on CD later that year.

In April 2018 he featured in an episode of series 45 of the BBC Radio 4 programme Great Lives, speaking in praise of Miles Davis.

Credits

References

1957 births
English jazz guitarists
English male guitarists
Living people
People from Northampton
Portishead (band) members
British male jazz musicians
Musicians from Bristol